Oneida Lake is the largest lake entirely within New York state, with a surface area of .
The lake is located northeast of Syracuse and near the Great Lakes. It feeds the Oneida River, a tributary of the Oswego River, which flows into Lake Ontario. From the earliest times until the opening of the Erie Canal in 1825, the lake was part of an important waterway connecting the Atlantic seaboard of North America to the continental interior.

Portions of six counties and 69 communities are in the watershed. Oneida Creek, which flows past the cities of Oneida and Sherrill, empties into the southeast part of the lake, at South Bay. While not geologically considered one of the Finger Lakes, Oneida Lake, because of its proximity, is referred by some as their "thumb". Because it is shallow, it is warmer than the deeper Finger Lakes in summer and its surface freezes solidly in winter. It is popular for the winter sports of ice fishing and snowmobiling.

Name

The lake is named for the Oneida, the Iroquoian Native American tribe that historically occupied a large region around the lake, one of the Six Nations of the Iroquois. The name Oneida comes from the word  Oneyoteaka, their endonym which translates to "People of the Standing Stone". The Oneida called the lake Tsioqui in their language, meaning "White Water".

History of navigation
During the 18th and early 19th centuries Oneida Lake and its tributary Wood Creek were part of the Albany-Oswego waterway from the Atlantic seaboard westward via the Hudson River and through the Appalachian Mountains via the Mohawk River; travel westward then was by portage over the Oneida Carry to the Wood Creek-Oneida Lake system. The navigable waterway exited Oneida Lake by the Oneida River, which led to the Oswego River and Lake Ontario, from where travelers could reach the other Great Lakes.

Following the American Revolutionary War, the United States forced the Iroquois nations to cede most of their lands in that region, as most of them had allied with the British, who were defeated. In addition, demand from settlers created pressure for such cessions. White settlers improved the natural waterway by constructing a canal with locks within Wood Creek to Oneida Lake. This system was significantly improved—from 1792 to 1803—by cutting a canal across the Oneida Carry, after which commercial shipping across Oneida Lake increased substantially.
 Even more significant was the completion in 1825 of the Erie Canal, which bypassed the Oneida Lake system and enhanced travel through the entire Mohawk Valley. This caused the population around the lake to lose their navigable waterway eastward.

Built poorly with wooden locks, the Oneida Canal was closed in 1863.

When the Erie Canal was redesigned and reconstructed to form the New York State Barge Canal in the early 20th century, the engineers made use of natural rivers and lakes where possible. The new barges were powered internally (by diesel or steam engines), so they could travel open water and against a current; the system no longer needed infrastructure for drawing vessels externally — i.e., drawpaths and draft animals. After it straightened Fish Creek on the east, the new canalway entered Oneida Lake at Sylvan Beach and exited west with the Oneida River at Brewerton. New terminal walls at Sylvan Beach, Cleveland, and Brewerton allowed barges to load and unload cargo and to stay overnight. A new break wall was installed, preventing lake waves from entering the canal and protecting against shoaling. These improvements provided towns along the shoreline of Oneida Lake with access again to navigable waterways east and west.

Geology

Oneida Lake is a remnant of Glacial Lake Iroquois, a large prehistoric lake formed when glaciers blocked (from downstream) the flow of the St. Lawrence River, the outlet of the Great Lakes to the Atlantic Ocean.

Adjacent places

Counties 
Madison County
Oneida County
Onondaga County
Oswego County

Towns and villages  
Brewerton—Southwest
Bridgeport—Southwest
Cicero—Southwest
Cleveland—North
Constantia—North
Hastings—West
Jewell—Northeast
Lakeport—South
Lenox—South
South Bay—Southeast
Sullivan—South
Sylvan Beach—East
Verona—East
Vienna—North
West Monroe—Northwest

State parks 
Frenchman Island State Park
Verona Beach State Park

Namesakes
Oneida Lake is the namesake of Oneida Lacus, a hydrocarbon lake on the Saturnian moon Titan. That "lake" is composed of liquid methane and ethane, and is located at 76.14°N and 131.83°W on Titan's globe.

Oneida County, Idaho is also named for the lake.

References

Notes

Further reading
 From 1900 to 1970, a region near the southeast shore of Oneida Lake was "the onion capital of the world".

External links

Oneida Lake View Webcam of Oneida Lake, North Shore
NYCanals.com: A guide to boating on Oneida Lake and surrounding waterways.
Oneida Lake Association

Oneida
Lakes of Madison County, New York
Lakes of Oneida County, New York
Lakes of Onondaga County, New York
Lakes of Oswego County, New York
Tourist attractions in Madison County, New York
Tourist attractions in Oneida County, New York
Tourist attractions in Onondaga County, New York
Tourist attractions in Oswego County, New York
Central New York
Lakes of New York (state)